Stunt Race FX, known in Japan as , is a cartoon-style, 3D-racing video game developed by Nintendo EAD with the assistance of Argonaut Software and published by Nintendo for the Super NES. It was the second game to use the 3D-centric Super FX powered GSU-1.

Stunt Race FX was added to the Nintendo Switch through the Nintendo Switch Online service on September 5, 2019, marking the first time the game has been re-released in over two decades.

Gameplay
The gameplay differs from Nintendo's own Super Mario Kart by being somewhat more difficult and through the lack of weapons to use to attack other vehicles in the game. Similarities with Nintendo's F-Zero include the ability to boost the speed of the vehicles; the use of the L and R buttons to make sharper turns; the possibility of damaging vehicles by running into walls, hazards, or other vehicles; and the possibility of receiving damage by falling.

Vehicles
There are three vehicles to choose from originally (F-Type, COUPE, and 4WD), as well as a fourth one that is unlockable (2WD); a fifth vehicle is only used in bonus games (TRAILER). Stunt Race FXs use of eyes on the vehicles was a late-in-development addition, to give character to otherwise personality-free cars. Each vehicle has different capabilities in terms of speed, body and acceleration. According to the instruction booklets in English, the vehicles are male, but in the Japanese instruction manual and the Japanese television commercial, the COUPE is female and every other vehicle is male.F-Type - A Formula One-like vehicle. His MAX SPEED is 140 MPH (220 km/h). He can be turned and controlled quickly and easily, because of his strong down-force, and accelerates very quickly to top speed. However, his ability to take damage is the weakest of all the vehicles. F-Type is designed for advanced players, who can either try drifting with the L and R buttons, or run F-Type more safely by controlling the gas pedal to match the tire grip. Players must be careful to adjust the balance of F-Type in mid-air using the steering buttons to land safely, due to his weak body; this technique is very important for anyone who uses F-Type.COUPE - A small, yellow, car with balanced settings. She is based on the car body style of the same name and is the only female car in the game. COUPE's MAX SPEED is 120 MPH (190 km/h), and she offers stable performance and tight steering. Her Boost meter consumption is also lower than the other vehicles; if the player controls COUPE well, the player can save a lot of time. Her tire grip is relatively low, which can require the player to use the L and R buttons to drift in the corners (while making sure not to slow down too much). COUPE is designed for intermediate players.4WD - A monster truck-like vehicle that has a powerful engine to balance his heavy weight. He is a monster machine with very large tires that give great grip performance, and is unsurpassed for off-road driving. His MAX SPEED is 100 MPH (160 km/h), making him the slowest vehicle (except the bonus-game-only TRAILER), and his steering is particularly heavy, which might require a player to turn quickly at every curve. He is the easiest vehicle to use in STUNT TRAX, according to the game's instruction booklet, and is designed for beginner players. While cornering, even if a player kept using the L and R buttons to steer harder, 4WD hardly spins. 4WD is the only vehicle players can use in TEST RUN.2WD - A two-wheeled vehicle, identified as a car in the manual. He can only be used in FREE TRAX after a player beats NOVICE class in SPEED TRAX; however, if a player clears MASTER class in SPEED TRAX, 2WD can be used in all modes. If a player uses the cornering buttons (L and R), 2WD will turn by shifting his weight left and right while leaning his body, but it is difficult to recover when 2WD loses balance. His MAX SPEED is 140 MPH (220 km/h).TRAILER - A special semi-trailer truck that can only be played in each SPEED TRAX Bonus Game. Because of his very large size and the flexibility of the hitch between the cab and trailer, he is very tough to drive. The SPEED TRAX Bonus Game featuring TRAILER uses a different camera angle, which can make controlling this vehicle more confusing than the others. It is impossible to damage this vehicle.

Modes
The game features five modes: three for racing levels, one for obstacle courses, one for test-driving, one for time-attacking, and one for multiplayer racing.SPEED TRAX - This mode can only be played by one player. Player must beat a class in order to move up to the next class. Each class has four courses and a Bonus Game. There are three classes: NOVICE (for beginner players), EXPERT (for intermediate players) and MASTER (for advanced players). For a total of fifteen tracks (twelve courses and three Bonus Games). To complete a course, player must complete three laps before time runs out. Every time a player completes a lap or passes through a Checkpoint, the countdown timer will extend. After the third lap is completed, all the time left will be taken to the next course. However, players can not carry more than 100 seconds. There are three rival vehicles for a player to compete against. If a player runs off course into a water hazard, completely fill up the Damage meter and destroys the vehicle, run in fourth/last place or if the timer drops to zero, the player loses a try and restarts the race on the same course. If the player runs out of tries, the game is over. Bonus Games are the only courses in this mode that allow players to either play them or not. They are also the only courses in the game where players can earn extra tries. After EXPERT class has been cleared, MASTER class will be unlocked.STUNT TRAX - The goal of this mode is to drive all the way through each course as fast as possible while touching every star in sight to make a perfect score. There are four courses exclusive in this mode: Ice Dance, Blue Lake, Rock Field and Up'n Down. There are four Areas and three gates per course. When driven through a gate, the gate will close, making the player unable to reenter the previous Areas already passed through. A Special Course called Radio Control can be unlocked after the other four courses have been cleared. Unlike the other four courses, Radio Control does not have any stars nor gates; it is actually a destruction derby course with the style of radio-controlling. The goal in this course is to run the vehicle the player is controlling into every other vehicle to destroy them.BATTLE TRAX - This mode is for head-to-head racing. Up to two computer players or human players can participate in this mode. For a computer player or two, players must have both standard controllers plugged in, while leaving at least one of them alone, in order to activate a computer player or two. There are four courses exclusive in this mode: Marine Pipe, Port Arena, Cotton Farm and Toxic Desert (titled as Toxic Dessert in the game).TEST RUN - This mode is designed for beginners to practice by test-driving. Only one vehicle (4WD) and one nameless course is playable in this mode. After finishing three laps, the screen blacks out while the mode select screen returns. After FREE TRAX is unlocked, TEST RUN will no longer be playable, but if the saved data was erased after FREE TRAX is unlocked, TEST RUN will be playable again.FREE TRAX''' - This mode can only be unlocked by beating either NOVICE class or EXPERT class in SPEED TRAX. Players use this mode for practicing courses from completed SPEED TRAX classes, including ones that are from the Bonus Games. This mode is also used for time-attacking. There is no time limit.

Graphics
The capabilities of the Super FX chip are demonstrated extensively in Stunt Race FX. Each course is constructed of 3D polygons, complete with road bumps and overhead passes. Detailed billboard advertisements also appear throughout each race course. The lack of speed is incorporated into the gameplay by featuring cars that are heavier and clumsier than those included in conventional racing games.

History

Development
In 1991, Nintendo began developing a custom 3D cartridge chip called the Super FX chip with Dylan Cuthbert from Argonaut Software (who is now at Q-Games) as their assistant, so that it could be used in Super NES games to create polygonal 3D graphics. The first game that used the Super FX was Star Fox, which became a success. After the release of Star Fox, Nintendo and Argonaut began conducting various experiments throughout the co-development of the Super FX chip. The development of Stunt Race FX, which was tentatively titled as FX Trax back then, started when Giles Goddard and Colin Reed joined in and later became Nintendo employees. Nintendo used the polygon concept to create a 3D-animated racing game filled with high-flying stunts and obstacles, as well as normal racing. While the game was solid, the overall product quality and timing of release weren't favorable to its success. Nintendo has since discontinued the idea of franchising the series. The one prior incident took form with a canceled sequel on the Nintendo 64 called Buggie Boogie.  created the official clay models of the Stunt Race FX vehicles used on the Japanese version's box art and the instruction booklet of all versions.

Although the game's 3D polygonal graphics are its main highlight, producer Shigeru Miyamoto also had its designers to place an emphasis on realistic vehicle dynamics. For instance, the F-Type's center of gravity is set at the rear of its body. The direction, weight and force applied by each tire to the road surface was made different, making it quicker and easier for the car's tail to swing out when cornering compared to other vehicles. Miyamoto stated that the player could notice these more subtle details by mastering each vehicle.

During early versions of the game, the 2WD vehicle was not a part of the car roster. In its place was a three-wheeled vehicle called the 3WD, bearing a color scheme very close to the 4WD's blue paint job.

Marketing

Two different television commercials were made and aired: one for Japan and one for North America and Europe. The Japanese commercial was a short Japanese animation showing the vehicles from the game in action along with gameplay footage of the game itself. It was narrated by Akira Kamiya. In the commercial for North America and Europe, it showed a police officer talking to the viewers (as the driver) who he thinks are breaking the law(s) while some gameplay footage of the game itself were shown. There were two slightly different versions of the English commercial.

Around the time Stunt Race FX was released in the United States, Nintendo of America teamed up with Kellogg's and Mattel to give away a promotional, Hot Wheels brand, F-Type race car to people who mailed two proofs from boxes of Apple Jacks to Kellogg's to receive it for free. The television commercial for it showed the toy car move across a kitchen table in front of a box of Apple Jacks while a young, blonde-haired boy wearing glasses looks at the toy car from behind the box of Apple Jacks. At the same time, the announcer in the commercial said: "Now you can get the Super NES Stunt Race FX car free, with two proofs from Kellogg's Apple Jacks", followed by a pit crew refilling the boy's bowl with Apple Jacks and milk and taking care of other things around him like clearing his glasses while the announcer said: "It's almost like the real thing". The limited-edition F-Type car have been quite rare, especially if still factory-sealed. It is a repaint of an existing Hot Wheels car called Shock Factor, which had already resembled F-Type.

ReceptionStunt Race FXs sales had surpassed 1 million copies by 1998. In the United Kingdom, it was the top-selling SNES game in October 1994.

Critics were varied in their response to the game. Electronic Gaming Monthly commented that Stunt Race FX is a disappointment after the first Super FX game, Star Fox, elaborating that "the game feels awkward with the touchy steering and the feeling of speed just isn't there. Overall, there are better racing games on the market". GamePro criticized that Stunt Race FX isn't realistic. They also thought the racing game "still delivers a good time, especially if you're not old enough to drive". Game Zero scored the game a 94 out of 100, saying the controls are "out of this world!" and the "attention to detail is truly superior". Edge gave it a 9 out of 10 rating, while stating that Stunt Race FX is "one of the best racing games currently available for any home system". In season 3's third episode of a mid 1990s British factual television programme Bad Influence!, a few reviewers combined their ratings into an overall score of 4 out of 5.

IGN ranked the game 86th in their Top 100 SNES games of All Time. In 2018, Complex rated Stunt Race FX 90th on their "The Best Super Nintendo Games of All Time". In 1995, Total! ranked Stunt Race FX 21st on their Top 100 SNES Games. They praised the game's graphics saying it was significantly better than Starwing writing: "It’s very different from your run-of-the-mill race game and manages to offer a wide range of challenges."

Related releases

Cameos
The Arwings from the Star Fox series made a cameo appearance in this title. In the Sky Ramp track, all four Arwings of the Star Fox Team will fly around in an air show-style. In the Night Cruise track, if a player's vehicle bumps into one of the first three Star Fox bill boards, an Arwing will drop a Boost power-up before the player enters the first tunnel.
Some billboards very briefly appear on courses with the faces of Mario, Fox McCloud, and Kirby.

Other appearances in media
 In the Wii game, Super Smash Bros. Brawl, two vehicles from Stunt Race FX appeared as two of the many Stickers to obtain. One was F-Type, the other was TRAILER (which was referred to as "Tractor Trailer"). The name of their origin was referred to as "Wild Trax" instead of "Stunt Race FX"; however, Stunt Race FX was mentioned in the Chronicles section of the same Wii game. A theme from the game was remixed (whether arranged or not) and was planned to be added to the game as a music track, but was cut for unknown reasons.
 Another installment in the Super Smash Bros. series, Super Smash Bros. Ultimate'', features the same two aforementioned vehicles as unlockable Spirits.

References

External links
Official Nintendo web page (Japanese) (Translated using Excite.Co.Jp)

1994 video games
Nintendo Entertainment Analysis and Development games
Nintendo games
Racing video games
Super FX games
Super Nintendo Entertainment System games
Video games developed in Japan
Video games developed in the United Kingdom
Video games produced by Shigeru Miyamoto
Nintendo Switch Online games
Multiplayer and single-player video games